Matthew Andrew Cavanaugh (born October 27, 1956) is an American football coach and former quarterback. During his playing career, he earned two Super Bowl rings. Since his retirement after the 1991 season, Cavanaugh has worked as an offensive coach and coordinator, for teams including the San Francisco 49ers, Chicago Bears, Baltimore Ravens, where he earned a third Super Bowl ring as a coach, Washington Redskins, and New York Jets.

Biography

Early career
Cavanaugh was born in Youngstown, Ohio, and attended Chaney High School.  He was a football standout and went on to the University of Pittsburgh after graduating. In 1976, he was the starting quarterback for the undefeated Pittsburgh Panthers (he was on the same team with Tony Dorsett) and contributed to the team's National Championship 27–3 victory over Georgia in the Sugar Bowl. On that day, Cavanaugh was selected as the Sugar Bowl's Most Valuable Player.

Cavanaugh was also named MVP of the 1977 Gator Bowl, throwing four touchdown passes in a 34–3 win over Clemson.

In 1977, Cavanaugh threw for 1,844 yards with 15 touchdowns against six interceptions. Cavanaugh threw for the second-most passing yards in Pittsburgh history, only trailing quarterback Ken Lucas's 1,921 yards in 1965.

Playing career
Cavanaugh was selected by the New England Patriots in the second round of the 1978 NFL Draft, but spent much of his career as a backup. His professional playing career included stints with the San Francisco 49ers, Philadelphia Eagles, and New York Giants. Cavanaugh was the backup quarterback in both the 1984 Super Bowl XIX and the 1990 Super Bowl XXV to Joe Montana and Jeff Hostetler, respectively.
Cavanaugh retired as a professional player following the 1991 season, appearing in 112 games with 19 starts, completing 305 of 579 passes for 4,332 yards, 28 touchdowns, 30 interceptions and a 71.7 passer rating.

Coaching career
Following his retirement, he has served in the following positions: chief recruiter and offensive coach, University of Pittsburgh (1992–1993); offensive coach, Arizona Cardinals (1994–1995); offensive coach, San Francisco 49ers (1996); offensive coordinator, Chicago Bears (1997–1998); and offensive coordinator, Baltimore Ravens (1999–2004), winning Super Bowl XXXV with the Ravens in 2000. Cavanaugh served as offensive coordinator for his old college team, the University of Pittsburgh Panthers, until 2008 when he accepted a position as an assistant coach and quarterbacks coach with the New York Jets. He would remain with the Jets until 2012.

On January 18, 2013, it was announced that Bears head coach Marc Trestman has hired Cavanaugh as the quarterbacks coach, replacing Jeremy Bates.

On January 28, 2015, Cavanaugh became the quarterbacks coach for the Washington Redskins. On January 23, 2017, Cavanaugh was promoted to offensive coordinator of the Redskins, replacing Sean McVay, who became the head coach of the Los Angeles Rams. On January 29, 2019, Cavanaugh was demoted to senior offensive assistant of the Redskins.

On August 25, 2021, Cavanaugh was hired by the New York Jets as a senior offensive assistant.

References

External links
 Washington Redskins bio

1956 births
Living people
American football quarterbacks
Arizona Cardinals coaches
Baltimore Ravens coaches
Chicago Bears coaches
National Football League offensive coordinators
New England Patriots players
New York Giants players
New York Jets coaches
Philadelphia Eagles players
Pittsburgh Panthers football players
Pittsburgh Panthers football coaches
San Francisco 49ers coaches
San Francisco 49ers players
Washington Redskins coaches
Players of American football from Youngstown, Ohio